Arizona has four Major League men's sports teams plus a professional WNBA team.

Major League Baseball

The Arizona Diamondbacks are a professional baseball team based in Phoenix, Arizona. They play their home games at Chase Field. They were founded in 1998 as an expansion team in the National League's West Division of the MLB. They became the fastest expansion team to win a World Series title (four seasons) when they beat three-time defending champ the New York Yankees in 2001.

National Basketball Association

The Phoenix Suns play in the NBA's Pacific Division and are the only team not from California in that division. They are also the only men's professional sports team left that do not brand themselves as an Arizona team, only from the city of Phoenix. They were founded in 1968 and play their home games in Talking Stick Resort Arena. They have appeared in three NBA Finals, but have yet to win a championship.

National Football League

The Arizona Cardinals are a professional football team based in Phoenix. They were founded in 1898 in Chicago, Illinois. They currently play at State Farm Stadium. They have never won a Super Bowl, but have had their stadium host a couple of them, including Super Bowl XLIX in 2015. They play in the National Football Conference's West Division.

National Hockey League

The Arizona Coyotes are a professional hockey league team based in Glendale. They play their home games at Gila River Arena. They have never played in a Stanley Cup Final. They moved to Arizona in 1996 from Winnipeg, Manitoba. They play in NHL's West Division.

Women's National Basketball Association

The Phoenix Mercury are a professional women's basketball team based in Phoenix. They play their home games at Talking Stick Resort Arena. They were founded in 1997 as one of the league's inaugural teams. They play in the Pacific Division of the WNBA. They have won three WNBA titles.

See also
 Sports in Arizona

References

 01
Professional
Arizona